Kuo Hsin-yen (born 16 January 1984), better known by her stage name Kuo Bea-ting or English name Bea Hayden, is a Taiwanese actress and model. She is best known for her work in the Tiny Times film series.

Biography 
Kuo Hsin-yen was born on January 16, 1984, in Taipei, Taiwan. She is of Eurasian descent, mostly Taiwanese with a quarter White American ancestry.

She emerged as a model in 2002, appearing in numerous Taiwanese fashion magazines.

Filmography

Films

Television series

References

External links 

 
 
 

1984 births
Living people
21st-century Taiwanese actresses
Taiwanese film actresses
Taiwanese television actresses
Taiwanese female models
Actresses from Taipei
Taiwanese people of American descent